The A7 is a national road in Latvia connecting Riga to the Lithuanian border (Grenctāle), through Bauska.  The road is also known in Latvia as the Bauska Highway.  The A7 is part of European route E67 (also known as the Via Baltica) and the European TEN-T road network.  The road becomes the Lithuanian A10 at the border.  The length of the A7 in Latvian territory is 86 kilometers. Currently the A7 has 2x2 lanes only within the territory of Riga, other parts have 1x2 lanes. The current speed limit is 90 km/h except within municipalities. In period of 2005 - 2006, the A7 was reconstructed from the 25th until the 43rd kilometer and from the 67th until the 85th kilometer.  A 2 kilometer stretch of the road was reconstructed in Iecava, and reconstruction of another 15 kilometer long stretch was finished in 2012. Construction of the Ķekava bypass is planned to begin in 2017. The bypass will be built to expressway or motorway  standards. The average traffic (AADT) on the A7 during 2016 was 14,599 cars per day.

References

A07